Leslie White (1900–1975) was an American anthropologist.

Leslie White may also refer to:
 Leslie White (rugby league, born c. 1910), Welsh rugby league footballer who played in the 1920s, 1930s and 1940s 
 Les White (rugby league, born 1920), English  rugby league footballer who played in the 1940s and 1950s
 Leslie White (rugby league), Australian rugby league footballer who played in the 1980s
 Les White (1890–1927), Australian rules footballer

See also
 Leslie Wight (1929–2004), cricketer